StarCraft is a science fiction media franchise made up of real-time strategy video games developed and published by Blizzard Entertainment. The series has several games which carry the main story arc: StarCraft, its expansion pack StarCraft: Brood War, and the trilogy StarCraft II. In addition, the series incorporates media that include spin-off video games, tabletop games, novelizations, graphic novels, and other literature. A variety of toys have also been produced. Set in the 26th century, the series revolves around three species fighting for dominance in a distant part of the Milky Way galaxy: the Terrans, humans exiled from Earth who are adept at conforming to any situation; the Zerg, a race of insectoids obsessed with the pursuit of genetic perfection through the assimilation of other races; and the Protoss, a humanoid species with advanced technology and psionic abilities attempting to preserve from the Zerg both their civilization and strict philosophical way of living.

Conceived by Chris Metzen and James Phinney, the StarCraft series has been a commercial and critical success. The first game, StarCraft, is regarded as being highly influential in the real-time strategy genre. Combined with its official expansion, Brood War, over 10 million copies of StarCraft have been sold globally. StarCraft remains one of the most popular online games in the world; Blizzard Entertainment reported an 800 percent increase in Battle.net service usage after the game's release in 1998. The original StarCraft and its expansion are particularly popular in South Korea, where a successful eSports scene has been established.

Games

Video games

Other games

Soundtracks

Printed media

Other media

References

External links
 Official StarCraft series website

Media
Media lists by video games franchise
Mass media by franchise